William Bradley Wilson (born July 21, 1998) is an American professional baseball shortstop in the San Francisco Giants organization. He played college baseball for the NC State Wolfpack. He was selected with the 15th overall pick of the 2019 Major League Baseball draft by the Los Angeles Angels.

Amateur career
Alongside baseball, Wilson also played football and basketball in middle school. Wilson attended Kings Mountain High School in Kings Mountain, North Carolina. While playing high school football, he was a nose guard turned quarterback until he quit in order to concentrate on baseball. As a senior, he hit .535/.673/1.253 with 14 home runs in 26 games. Undrafted out of high school in the 2016 Major League Baseball draft, he enrolled at North Carolina State University where he played college baseball for the NC State Wolfpack.

In 2017, as a freshman at NC State playing primarily second base, Wilson started all 61 games and batted .300/.377/.504 with 21 doubles (tied for the league lead; the second-highest total of any freshman in the nation), eight home runs, and 48 RBIs. He was named to the ACC All-Freshman Team along with being named a Freshman All-American by D1Baseball and Collegiate Baseball Magazine. As a sophomore in 2018, playing shortstop he hit .307/.376/.588 with three triples, 15 home runs, and 53 RBIs in 59 games. During the season, he was named ACC Player of the Week three times, which set an NC State record. He was also named to the All ACC-First Team. After the season, he played for the USA Baseball Collegiate National Team.

Prior to the 2019 season, Wilson was named a preseason All-American by multiple media outlets including Baseball America and Collegiate Baseball Newspaper. He was named the ACC Defender of the Year along with being named to the All ACC-First Team for the second consecutive year. He played shortstop and finished the season slashing .339/.425/.665 with 20 doubles, 16 home runs, and 57 RBIs in 55 games.

Professional career
Wilson was considered one of the top prospects for the 2019 Major League Baseball draft. He was selected by the Los Angeles Angels with the 15th overall selection. He signed with the Angels on June 10 for a signing bonus of $3.4 million. After signing, he made his professional debut with the Orem Owlz of the Rookie Advanced Pioneer League. Over 46 games, he slashed .275/.328/.439 in 189 at bats with 23 runs, five home runs, and 18 RBIs.

On December 10, 2019, Wilson and Zack Cozart were traded to the San Francisco Giants in exchange for a player to be named later or cash considerations. He did not play a minor league game in 2020 due to the cancellation of the minor league season caused by the COVID-19 pandemic. 

To begin 2021, he was assigned to the Eugene Emeralds of the High-A West. After slashing .251/.339/.497 in 195 at bats with 37 runs, ten home runs, and 26 RBIs over 49 games, he was promoted to the Richmond Flying Squirrels of the Double-A Northeast in early July. Over 51 games with Richmond, Wilson batted .189/.281/.306 in 196 at bats with five home runs and 22 RBIs. He was selected to play in the Arizona Fall League for the Scottsdale Scorpions after the season. 

He returned to Richmond to begin the 2022 season. In mid-May, he was promoted to the Sacramento River Cats of the Triple-A Pacific Coast League, but he was reassigned to Richmond in late August. He missed time during the season due to injury, and rehabbed with the Rookie-level Arizona Complex League Giants. Over a combined 71 games played for the season in three leagues, he hit .250/.346/.452 in 252 at bats with 43 runs, 13 home runs, and 38 RBIs. He played 44 games at shortstop, 19 at second base, and 4 at third base.

Personal life
Wilson's mother, Robin, played softball at Winthrop.

Wilson earned his finance degree from NC State in three years.

References

External links

 NC State Wolfpack bio

1998 births
Living people
People from Kings Mountain, North Carolina
Baseball players from North Carolina
Baseball shortstops
United States national baseball team players
NC State Wolfpack baseball players
All-American college baseball players
Orem Owlz players
Eugene Emeralds players
Richmond Flying Squirrels players
Scottsdale Scorpions players
Sacramento River Cats players